Alypiodes flavilinguis is a species of moth in the family Noctuidae, first described by Augustus Radcliffe Grote in 1883. Its name has been lifted as a synonymy of Alypiodes bimaculata (Herrich-Schäffer, 1853) in 2021. It can be found in New Mexico, Arizona, and Texas.

Description 
Its key feature is the metallic blue patches on its costa. They are an overall black moth with three pale yellow patches on its forewing.

References

External links 
Alypiodes - Geometrinae -​ North American Emerald Moths of the US and Canada (friendscentral.org)

Agaristinae
Moths described in 1883
Moths of North America
Taxa named by Augustus Radcliffe Grote